The Yonkers Motorcycle Club   originally started as The Yonkers Bicycle Club and was founded on November 19, 1879. The Yonkers Motorcycle Club was formed in 1903 in Yonkers, New York by President  George "Usco " Ellis. George Ellis was married January 25, 1916 to Miss Louise Smith of Yonkers. George "USCO" Ellis was appointed State Commissioner for  New York of the Federation of American Motorcyclists in August 1915. The Yonkers Motorcycle Club served as a civil defense messenger service  during the earlier part of the 1900s delivering  messages to various government officials throughout the country. An article taken from the Boston Daily  Globe March 11, 1921, titled Cyclists Return After Call on Vice President, describes the journey that George A. Ellis  and Henry E Andrews made when they left Boston on a Sunday morning at 9 o'clock am, bearing a message from Gov.Cox to Vice President Coolidge. They completed their first leg of the journey, a distance of 510 miles, in 22 hours and 45 minutes, arriving in Washington Monday morning. They left Washington at 8' o'clock Tuesday morning, and stopped at Ellis' home, Yonkers, en route to Boston.[3]  Since 1924, the club has been chartered by the American Motorcyclist Association.  The Yonkers Motorcycle Club  is  the oldest active motorcycle club in the world.

References
 3. ↑Boston Daily Globe Boston, United States of America March 11, 1921 Category: Other Articles

External links
Yonkers MC website

1903 establishments in New York (state)
Motorcycle clubs in the United States